Janan Sawa (born 1956 in Dohuk, Iraq) is an Assyrian musician who is noted for making Assyrian folk dance. Janan started singing in 1972, at the age of 17. Janan has performed throughout the world, and has visited his hometown of Duhok in Iraq on many occasions.

Biography
In 1975, Janan's father forced him to marry. He spent 4 years in the Iraqi army, from 1974 to 1978.  In 1980, Janan fled Iraq and settled in Greece for 2 years. He finally left for the United States in 1982, where he remains a resident. After arriving in the U.S., Janan worked as a taxicab driver for 2 years. In 1984, he was hired by a restaurant to sing on a nightly basis. In 1985, he recorded his first studio album, named "Nohadra", the Assyrian name for his hometown, Dohuk. The album ultimately established his professional singing career, and until this date Janan has released over 25 albums and recorded close to 200 songs.

During his time in Dohuk, Janan would sing on regular occasions such as picnics and family events. Janan has also appeared and performed live on music television programs in Iraq.

Style
Janan's musical style is influenced by Assyrian/Syriac village folklore.

Personal life
Janan has married three times and has since been divorced. He has two daughters with his two of his ex-wives. He got engaged in 2018 and he currently resides in Michigan. His brother, Esam Sawa, is also a singer.

Discography
1985 - Nohadra
1986 - Tamboree
1986 - Zamareh
1987 - Yema
1988 - Sayada
1989 - Jwanka D'Hakkari
1990 - Lawando
1991 - Kirkuk
1992 - Ana Ewan Beth Nahrin
1993 - Zowaa
1994 - Kha B'Nisan
1995 - Shara D'Ninwahyeh
1996 - Mix of Janan Sawa
1997 - Nahrin
1998 - Broony
2001 - Shtwaher Ya Yema
2002 - Bderen L'Nohadra
2002 - Lenwa Ana
2004 - Qinate Min Atra
2005 - Hekle Tlekhe
2006 - Zorna Dahola
2006 - Kholma Sharira
2008 - Ishtar
2011 - Zamrin B'Khobakh
2012 - Atta
2013 - Bayenna

External links
Songs of Assyria
Qeenatha: Janan Sawa
Phoenix Production: Janan Sawa

References

1956 births
Living people
21st-century Iraqi male singers
Assyrian musicians
Chaldean Catholics
Iraqi Eastern Catholics
Iraqi emigrants to the United States
20th-century Iraqi male singers
Syriac-language singers
People from Duhok